Raktham - The Blood is a 2019 Indian Telugu language Naxal propaganda political thriller film, written, and directed by Rajesh Touchriver, starring Maganti Banarjee, Madhu Shalini, and Sanju Sivaram in pivotal roles. Upon release, the film received mixed to positive reviews, and was featured at the All Lights India International Film Festival.

Premise
Raktham is inspired by Albert Camus’s 1949 Play, The Just Assassins. Raktham exploits Indian guerrillas, and Naxalite–Maoist insurgency in the interiors of Andhra Pradesh and Telangana.

References

External links

2019 films
Films shot in Telangana
Films about Naxalism
Indian avant-garde and experimental films
2019 crime thriller films
Indian crime thriller films
Films set in forests
Indian political thriller films
2020s Telugu-language films
Fictional portrayals of police departments in India
Fictional portrayals of the Andhra Pradesh Police
Fictional portrayals of the Telangana Police
2020s avant-garde and experimental films
2020s political thriller films
Films set in Andhra Pradesh
Films set in Telangana
French plays adapted into films